Solanum quadriloculatum is known under the (ambiguous) common names of "bush tomato" or (in Australia) "wild tomato". It is a small fruiting shrub in the family Solanaceae. It was, and occasionally still is, included in S. ellipticum by some authors. Generally, these two species of "bush tomatoes" are currently considered distinct.

It is native to Australia, where it is found primarily in shrubby eucalypt woodland and arid-zone shrublands.

References

Footnotes

  (2006): Solanum species of Eastern Australia – Solanum quadriloculatum. Version of 2006-OCT-08. Retrieved 2007-DEC-02.
  [2007]: Electronic Flora of South Australia – Solanum quadriloculatum. Retrieved 2007-DEC-02.
  (2005):  – Solanum quadriloculatum. Version of March 2007. Retrieved 2008-SEP-25.

quadriloculatum
Eudicots of Western Australia
Flora of the Northern Territory
Flora of South Australia
Flora of Queensland
Flora of New South Wales
Solanales of Australia
Taxa named by Ferdinand von Mueller